Jorge di Giandoménico (21 September 1930 – 7 September 2006) was an Argentine sports shooter. He competed at the 1960, 1972 and 1976 Summer Olympics.

References

1930 births
2006 deaths
Argentine male sport shooters
Olympic shooters of Argentina
Shooters at the 1960 Summer Olympics
Shooters at the 1972 Summer Olympics
Shooters at the 1976 Summer Olympics
Sportspeople from Santa Fe, Argentina
Pan American Games bronze medalists for Argentina
Pan American Games medalists in shooting
Shooters at the 1959 Pan American Games